Richard Okunorobo Islas (born 14 August 1988) is a Mexican professional footballer who plays for Venados in the Ascenso MX.

Early life
Okunorobo was born in Puebla to a Nigerian father and Mexican mother.

Club career
Okunorobo played with the Chapulineros de Oaxaca of the Liga de Balompié Mexicano in 2021.

Honours

Club
Chapulineros de Oaxaca
 Liga de Balompié Mexicano: 2021

References

External links
 
 

1988 births
Living people
People from Puebla (city)
Footballers from Puebla
Association football central defenders
Lobos BUAP footballers
Dorados de Sinaloa footballers
Alebrijes de Oaxaca players
Unión Deportivo Universitario players
Venados F.C. players
Ascenso MX players
Liga Premier de México players
Tercera División de México players
USL Second Division players
Liga de Balompié Mexicano players
Mexican expatriate footballers
Mexican expatriate sportspeople in the United States
Expatriate soccer players in the United States
Mexican expatriate sportspeople in Panama
Expatriate footballers in Panama
Mexican people of Nigerian descent
Mexican footballers